Isla Ratón is a Venezuelan town, capital of the municipality amazonense de Autana. It is also a 40 km² fluvial island located in the course of the Orinoco River right next to the municipality of Puerto Carreño in the Department of Vichada in the Republic of Colombia.

With a population of 12,612 inhabitants, according to the 2011 census, it is the fourth most inhabited municipality after Atures. The town is called "Ratón del Carmen" and has a mayor's office, prefecture, rural medicine, malariology, cultural houses, plazas, courts, a church, schools, high schools, markets and shops.

History 
Mouse Island was a community of few inhabitants, founded by Pedro Loroima and other companions in 1943. After its foundation, it grew until it formed a community that today has become a habitable, walkable town and one of the connectors with the other municipalities of the state.

Culture 
It is made up of multi-ethnic peoples such as the curripacos, piaroa, criollos, jivi among others.

Economy 
The Colombian Peso is widely used and Colombian products are mostly sold as well as Colombian telecommunications services.

Populated places in Amazonas (Venezuelan state)
River islands of Venezuela